The International Review of Financial Analysis is a bimonthly peer-reviewed academic journal in the field of finance. It is  one of the leading academic finance journals, being ranked as an "ABS3" journal by the Chartered Association of Business Schools. It was established by George Frankfurter and George Philipattos in 1992 and published, originally, by JAI Press, Connecticut. Currently it is published by Elsevier. According to the Journal Citation Reports, the journal has a 2021 impact factor of 8.235.

References

External links

Finance journals
Bimonthly journals
Elsevier academic journals
Publications established in 1992
English-language journals